Acrothinium gaschkevitchii is a species of leaf beetle in the family Chrysomelidae. It is distributed in East Asia.

Etymology
The species is named after the wife of Russian diplomat Iosif Goshkevich. She had collected specimens of the species in the vicinity of her residence at "Khokodody" in Japan.

Subspecies
There are five subspecies of A. gaschkevitchii:
 Acrothinium gaschkevitchii gaschkevitchii (Motschulsky, 1861) – China (Fujian, Jiangxi, Zhejiang), Taiwan, Japan, South Korea
 Acrothinium gaschkevitchii matsuii Nakane, 1956 – Japan (Okinoerabu)
 Acrothinium gaschkevitchii okinawense Nakane, 1985 – Japan (Okinawa)
 Acrothinium gaschkevitchii shirakii Nakane, 1956 – Japan (Amami Ōshima, Okinawa)
 Acrothinium gaschkevitchii tokaraense Nakane, 1956 – Japan (Tokara Islands)

References

External links

 

Eumolpinae
Beetles of Asia
Taxa named by Victor Motschulsky
Beetles described in 1861
Insects of Japan
Insects of China
Insects of Taiwan
Insects of Korea